Crosshill railway station served the village of Crosshill, South Ayrshire, Scotland, from 1860 to 1862 on the Maybole and Girvan Railway.

History 
The station was opened on 24 May 1860 by the Glasgow and South Western Railway. From August 1861, trains were reduced to Tuesdays only. It was a short-lived station, only being open for less than two years, closing on 1 March 1862.

References 

Disused railway stations in South Ayrshire
Railway stations in Great Britain opened in 1860
Railway stations in Great Britain closed in 1862
1860 establishments in Scotland
1862 disestablishments in Scotland